

503001–503100 

|-id=033
| 503033 New Hampshire ||  || The state of New Hampshire is located in the northeast corner of the United States, within the region of New England. The capitol is the city of Concord. It is nicknamed The Granite State due to its high supply of quality granite. The state motto, Live Free or Die, accurately captures the strongly held sentiment of its citizens. || 
|}

503101–503200 

|-bgcolor=#f2f2f2
| colspan=4 align=center | 
|}

503201–503300 

|-bgcolor=#f2f2f2
| colspan=4 align=center | 
|}

503301–503400 

|-bgcolor=#f2f2f2
| colspan=4 align=center | 
|}

503401–503500 

|-bgcolor=#f2f2f2
| colspan=4 align=center | 
|}

503501–503600 

|-bgcolor=#f2f2f2
| colspan=4 align=center | 
|}

503601–503700 

|-bgcolor=#f2f2f2
| colspan=4 align=center | 
|}

503701–503800 

|-bgcolor=#f2f2f2
| colspan=4 align=center | 
|}

503801–503900 

|-bgcolor=#f2f2f2
| colspan=4 align=center | 
|}

503901–504000 

|-bgcolor=#f2f2f2
| colspan=4 align=center | 
|}

References 

503001-504000